The A1421 is a short minor 'A' road in the English county of Cambridgeshire. It links Haddenham (and the A1123, which it meets there) with the A142 near Sutton, which leads to Ely, Cambridgeshire.

See also
List of A roads in Zone 1 of the Great Britain numbering scheme

References

Roads in England